A by-election was held for the New South Wales Legislative Assembly electorate of Shoalhaven on 21 August 1871 because Thomas Garrett resigned to accept appointment as a police magistrate at Berrima.

Dates

Result

Thomas Garrett resigned.

See also
Electoral results for the district of Shoalhaven
List of New South Wales state by-elections

References

1871 elections in Australia
New South Wales state by-elections
1870s in New South Wales